Ordre des Avocats de Guinée (Lawyer's Order of Guinea) is a union of lawyers in Guinea. The General Secretary of the council of the order is Boubacar Sow.

References

Organisations based in Guinea